The Tākri script (Takri (Chamba): ; Takri (Jammu/Dogra): ; sometimes called Tankri ) is an abugida writing system of the Brahmic family of scripts. It is derived from the Sharada script formerly employed for Kashmiri. It is the sister script of Laṇḍā scripts. It is another variant of Dogra Takri (also known as Dogra Akkhar) employed in Jammu region. Chamba Takri was considered by Grierson as the standard form of Takri, primarily because it was the first variety that was developed for print. In addition to Chamba and Dogra, there are numerous varieties, “with each Hill State or tract having its own style.” Until the late 1940s, the adapted version of the script (called Dogri, Dogra or Dogra Akkhar) was the official script for writing Dogri in the princely state of Jammu and Kashmir and for Kangri, Chambyali and Mandyali in Himachal Pradesh. However, the Takri script used in the Sirmour in Himachal Pradesh and Jaunsar-Bawar region has some distinction.

History
The Takri alphabet developed through the Devāśeṣa stage of the Sharada script from the 14th-18th centuries and is found mainly in the Hill States such as Chamba and surrounding areas, where it is called Chambyali, and in Jammu Division, where it is known as Dogri. The local Takri variants got the status of official scripts in some of the Punjab Hill States, and were used for both administrative and literary purposes until the 19th century. After 1948, when Himachal Pradesh was established as an administrative unit, the local Takri variants were replaced by Devanagari.

Takri itself has historically been used to write a number of Western and Central Pahari languages in the Western Himalaya, such as Gaddi or Gaddki (the language of the Gaddi ethnic group), Kishtwari (a language, or possibly a highly idiosyncratic dialect of Kashmiri, spoken in the Kishtwar region of Jammu and Kashmir) and Chambeali (the language of the Chamba region of Himachal Pradesh). Takri used to be most prevalent script for business records and communication in various parts of Himachal Pradesh including the regions of Chintpurni, Una, Kangra, Bilaspur and Hamirpur. The aged businessmen can still be found using Takri in these areas, but the younger generation have now shifted to Devanagari and even English (Roman). This change can be traced to the early days of Indian independence (1950s−80s).

Revival movement
Since Takri fell into disuse, there have been sporadic attempts to revive the script in Himachal Pradesh. Recent efforts have been made to teach the script to Himachalis.

The Takri (Tankri) script was also used in cinema. The first film in Himachali dialects of Western Pahari called Saanjh directed by Ajay K Saklani released in April 2017 used Takri script in its title and beginning credits. Workshops are being conducted in small scale in the state of Himachal Pradesh, in districts like Chamba and Kullu, Kangra and Shimla. An organization named Sambh (Devanagari: सांभ) based at Dharamshala has decided to develop fonts for this script.

A Western Pahari Corridor from Shimla to Murree has also been proposed under the Aman ki Asha initiative to link the similar Western Pahari language-based regions of Himachal Pradesh, Jammu, Azad Kashmir and Pothohar Plateau and revive the script.

The Himachal Pradesh government under the National Manuscript Mission Yojana has set up a Manuscript Resource Centre and so far 1.26 lakh (1,26,000) manuscripts, including those in Takri, have been catalogued and has decided to be digitised.

Varieties 
There are several regional varieties of Takri, “with each Hill State or tract having its own style ”.  There is considerable variation in the spellings of the names of the regional forms and the languages they represent. The names of languages have also changed, so that the names used in Grierson and other sources differ from current practices. In order to assist in the identification of languages and the forms of Takri associated with them, the language names below are denoted using ISO639-3 codes. Specimens of Takri representative of the regional form is also indicated.

 Bhattiyali [bht]: Bhateali, Bhatiali 
 Chambeali [cdh]: Chambiali, Chameali, Chamiali 
 Dogri [dgo], [doi]: Dogri 
 Gaddi [gbk]: Bharmauri, Gadi
 Gahri [bfu]: Bunan 
 Jaunsari [jns]
 Kangri [xnr]: Kangri
 Kinnauri [kjo]: Kanauri 
 Kishtwari [kas]: Kashtwari
 Kulvi [kfx]: Kullu, Kului, Kullvi 
 Mahasu [bfz]: Kochi, Kiunthali 
 Mandeali [mjl]: Himachali, Mandi 
 Sirmauri [srx]
The standard for the script has been the Chambeali version; which has been encoded in the Unicode.

A variety of Takri which was used for Sirmauri and Jaunsari has been proposed to be encoded in the Unicode.

In Unicode 

Takri script was added to the Unicode Standard in 2012 (version 6.1).

References

External resources
 Aksharamukha Takri https://aksharamukha.appspot.com/describe/Takri
 Omniglot Takri, https://omniglot.com/writing/takri.htm
 Comparative examples of Takri and related scripts (Spanish language website), http://www.proel.org/index.php?pagina=alfabetos/takri
 A discussion of the Gaddi, with a reference to Takri, https://www.npr.org/2006/08/08/5625318/the-gaddi-people-of-dharamsala
 Ancient script of the Himalayas fights for survival, https://zeenews.india.com/home/ancient-script-of-indian-mountains-fights-for-survival_275913.html

Brahmic scripts
Sarada scripts
Dogri language
Obsolete writing systems